Edward J. Coyle is an American paralympic weightlifter. He competed at the 1972, 1976 and 1980 Summer Paralympics.

Biography 
Coyle was born in Lansdowne, Pennsylvania. He contracted polio at the age of two. He attended Monsignor Bonner High School, where he was on the football and rowing teams before taking up weightlifting. He attended West Chester University, earning a PhD in 1977.

Coyle competed at the 1972 Summer Paralympics, winning the gold medal in the men's middleweight weightlifting. At the 1976 Summer Paralympics Coyle won the gold medal in the men's lightweight event. He scored 177.5 pounds. At the 1980 Summer Paralympics he won the silver medal in the men's middleweight - 75kg paraplegic event.

References

External links 

Possibly living people
Year of birth missing (living people)
People from Lansdowne, Pennsylvania
Sportspeople from Pennsylvania
People with polio
Medalists at the 1972 Summer Paralympics
Medalists at the 1976 Summer Paralympics
Medalists at the 1980 Summer Paralympics
Weightlifters at the 1972 Summer Paralympics
Weightlifters at the 1976 Summer Paralympics
Weightlifters at the 1980 Summer Paralympics
Paralympic powerlifters of the United States
Paralympic medalists in weightlifting
Paralympic gold medalists for the United States
Paralympic silver medalists for the United States
West Chester University alumni